Tallarook  is a town the Shire of Mitchell local government area in central Victoria, Australia.

Tallarook Post Office opened on 1 April 1861.

The town is known in Australia for the colloquialism, "Things are crook in Tallarook", believed to date to the Great Depression and unemployed travellers seeking work. The phrase became the basis of a song composed by Jack O'Hagan—Things Is Crook in Tallarook.

The main North East railway opened through the town in 1872 along with the local railway station, and a branch railway to Mansfield was started in 1883, extended to Mansfield in 1891, and Alexandra in 1909, before being closed on 18 November 1978.

Tallarook came to public attention in 1880 with the discovery of a recluse living in the ranges nearby. Dubbed A Wildman at Tallarook, emigrant Henricke Nelsen was arrested and jailed, causing quite a sensation in the region. He is the subject of a 2008 book by Robert Hollingworth. While this book fictionalises Nelsen's life, much of the region's early history is also detailed. 
 
The town is home to a cricket club competing in the Seymour District Cricket Association.

The industrialist Essington Lewis settled near Tallarook on his property, Landscape in his later years until his death in 1961.

References

External links

Community website
Goulburn River High Country Rail Trail

Towns in Victoria (Australia)
Shire of Mitchell
1861 establishments in Australia
Hume Highway